

Coal in Poland is partly mined and partly imported. 144 million metric tons of coal was mined in 2012, providing 55 percent of that country's primary energy consumption, and 75 percent of electrical generation. Poland is the second-largest coal-mining country in Europe, after Germany, and the ninth-largest coal producer in the world. The country consumes nearly all the coal it mines, and is no longer a major coal exporter.

Coal mines are concentrated mainly in Upper Silesia. The most profitable mines were Marcel Coal Mine and Zofiówka Coal Mine. In communist times (1945-1989) one of the most important and largest mines was 1 Maja Coal Mine.

As of 2020, coal powered 74% of Poland's electricity generation. However extraction is becoming increasingly difficult and expensive, and has become uncompetitive against Russian imports, which are cheaper and of higher quality. The industry now relies on government subsidies, taking nearly all of the annual €1.6 billion government energy sector support. In September 2020, the government and mining union agreed a plan to phase out coal by 2049, but this has been criticised by environmentalists as too late to be compatible with the Paris Agreement to limit climate change.

As of early 2022, Poland imported roughly a fifth of its coal, with 75% of these imports coming from Russia. In late March 2022, Poland's government announced that it would ban Russian coal imports due to the 2022 Russian invasion of Ukraine, with imports from Russia to cease entirely by April or May 2022. The effectiveness of this decision has been questioned as any trade ban would be likely to contravene EU rules because the vast majority of Russian coal is imported by private companies. The Polish government has not outlined plans on how it will replace Russian imports (which stood at 8.3 mln tons or around 66% of all coal imported to Poland in 2021) or deal with reduced coal supply. Russia's Ministry of Energy expressed doubt that Poland would be able to rapidly replace Russian coal.

Impact on health
Coal mines are affecting the public health of the Polish population. Greenpeace found out that in Poland 5,400 people per year die as a consequence of the pollution through the burned coal. There is also a link between the  impact of air pollution on the public health of people. Pollution of coal mines in Poland caused approximately 630 cases of chronic bronchitis, 1,310 admissions to the hospitals, in total 359,200 and 27,830 asthma attacks for children under 18 years.

Environment

Coal mining has dropped the water level of Lake Ostrowskie by almost two meters in the Kuyavia–Pomerania and the lakes in the Powidz Landscape Park. According to the University of Life Sciences in Poznań, the water drainage in the Kleczew brown coal mining areas has formed craters in the area.

In April 2008, five thousand people demonstrated in Kruszwica to protect cultural heritage and the nature reserve at Lake Gopło, against the Tomisławice opencast mine, which was due to open in 2009. This was the first protest of its kind in the country's history. Gopło Millennium Park (Nadgoplański Park Tysiąclecia) is protected by the European Union's Natura 2000 program and includes a major bird sanctuary.

See also
 Coal mining
 Energy in Poland

Citations

Coal in Poland
Energy in Poland